Zviadi Khanjaliashvili (born 5 January 1983) is a Georgian judoka.

Achievements

External links
 

1983 births
Living people
Male judoka from Georgia (country)